Charlotte Roueché  (born 1946) is a British academic who specialises in the analysis of texts, inscribed or in manuscripts, from the Roman, Late Antique, and Byzantine periods. She is particularly interested in those from the Asia Minor cities of ancient Ephesos and Aphrodisias. She is also interested in the interface between digital humanities and classical and Byzantine studies. She is Professor Emerita of Digital Hellenic Studies at King's College London, and Honorary Fellow of the Institute of Classical Studies, University of London.

Roueché has a degree in Classics from Newnham College, Cambridge.

On 21 June 2018, Roueché was awarded a Docteur honoris causa by the l’École Pratique des Hautes Études, Sorbonne University, Paris. The title is 'one of the most prestigious distinctions awarded by French universities to honor personalities of foreign nationality because of outstanding services to science, literature or the arts'. Her honorary lecture was 'Le défi Robert: transformation d’une discipline'.

In 2019 she gave The Susan Hockey Lecture in Digital Humanities at University College London, 'Wider Horizons, Harder Borders or Whose data are they, anyway?' Also in 2019, she delivered the 10th Barron Memorial Lecture at the Institute of Classical Studies, London; the lecture was titled 'Forming/informing the modern world? The role of classical scholarship'.

Selected publications
Heritage Gazetteer of Libya, co-editor
Heritage Gazetteer of Cyprus, co-editor
Inscriptions of Roman Cyrenaica (2020), by Joyce M. Reynolds, Charlotte Roueché and Gabriel Bodard. Society for Libyan Studies. 
Roueche, C., 2020, “Celebrity and Power: Circus Factions forty years on.” In Harris, W. & Hunnel Chen, A. (eds.), Late Antique Studies in Memory of Alan Cameron. Leiden: Brill, pp. 247-259
Abdelhamed, M. H. H. & Roueché, C., 2019, “Digitising Libyan heritage: Inscriptions and toponomy.” Libyan Studies 50, pp. 87-92.
Inscriptions of Roman Tripolitania, by J. M. Reynolds and J. B. Ward-Perkins, enhanced electronic reissue by Gabriel Bodard and Charlotte Roueché (2009). . Third edition in 2021: Inscriptions of Roman Tripolitania, by Charlotte Roueché, Gabriel Bodard, Caroline Barron, Irene Vagionakis et al. Society for Libyan Studies. 
Sharing Ancient Wisdoms, co-edited by Charlotte M Roueché, Elvira Wakelnig, and Anna Jordanous (2013) 
Inscriptions of Aphrodisias (2007), by Joyce Reynolds, Charlotte Roueché, Gabriel Bodard, .
Aphrodisias in Late Antiquity: The Late Roman and Byzantine Inscriptions, revised second edition, 2004,  . 
Aphrodisias papers 3: the setting and quarries, mythological and other sculptural decoration, architectural development, Portico of Tiberius (1996): co-editor with R.R.R.Smith
Performers and partisans at Aphrodisias in the Roman and late Roman periods (1993) with a section by Nathalie de Chaisemartin
The Making of Byzantine history: studies dedicated to Donald M. Nicol (1993): co-editor, with Roderick Beaton
Aphrodisias papers: recent Work on Architecture and Sculpture: Including the Papers Given at the Second *International Aphrodisias Colloquium Held at King's College (1990): co-editor with K.T.Erim.
Aphrodisias in late antiquity: the late Roman and Byzantine inscriptions (1989)
'Acclamations in the Later Roman Empire: New Evidence from Aphrodisias', Journal of Roman Studies, Volume 74 November 1984, pp. 181–99

References 

Alumni of Newnham College, Cambridge
Living people
Academics of King's College London
Fellows of the Society of Antiquaries of London
1946 births
British classical scholars
Women classical scholars
Fellows of King's College London